{{safesubst:#invoke:RfD|||month = March
|day = 10
|year = 2023
|time = 16:32
|timestamp = 20230310163248

|content=
REDIRECT Ross School of Business

}}